Nispey (also Romanized as Nīspey) is a village in Tutaki Rural District, in the Central District of Siahkal County, Gilan Province, Iran. At the 2006 census, its population was 21, in 5 families.

References 

Populated places in Siahkal County